The  is Japanese aerial lift line in Asahidake Onsen, Higashikawa, Hokkaidō, operated by . The ropeway line, founded in 1968 and refurbished in 2000, climbs Mount Asahi-dake of Daisetsuzan Mountains, the tallest mountain in Hokkaidō. The line mainly transports spectators of alpine plants in summer and autumn colors in autumn, while there also is a ski area.

During the summer months, the lift operates once every 15 minutes and every 20 minutes during the winter months. It takes 10 minutes to complete a one-way trip.

Stations

The two connecting stations at the foot and submit of the ropeway are:

Sanroku Station (Asahi-dake Station) 

 Altitude 1,100m
Main attractions and facilities in the surrounding area include:
 Foothills shop
 Foothills dining room "Alpine Flora"
 Asahidake Onsen

Sugatami Station (Sancho Station) 
 Altitude 1,600m
Main attractions and facilities in the surrounding area include:
 Mountain top shop (open only during the top season)
 Sugatami no Ike Pond (famous for its reflection of the peaks, snow, and steam escaping from the volcanic vents)
 Alpine flora
 Access to the 5 observatories
 1.7km hiking course
 Asahi-dake summit (elevation 2,290m)

Basic data

Distance: 
Vertical interval:

See also
List of aerial lifts in Japan

External links

 Official website

Aerial tramways in Japan
Tourist attractions in Hokkaido
Transport in Hokkaido